Sam Houston (1793–1863) was an American politician and soldier in Texas.

Sam Houston may also refer to:

People 
 Sam Houston (Maine soldier) (fl. 1770s), American soldier
 Sam Houston (wrestler) (born 1963), American wrestler
 Samuel Walker Houston (1864–1945), African-American pioneer in the field of education

Other 
 Sam Houston State University, in Texas
 Sam Houston Bearkats, the university's athletic program
 Sam Houston Race Park, for horses
 Sam Houston (Toward the Terra), fictional human character in comic & animation
 Sam Houston Monument, a 1925 bronze sculpture by Enrico Cerracchio

See also
 List of places named for Sam Houston
 Samuel B. Huston (1858–1920), American politician 
 

Houston, Sam